Kyle Rowe (born 8 February 1998 in Ascot) is a Scotland international rugby union player. He plays as a Wing for English Premiership Rugby side London Irish.

Rugby Union career

Amateur career

Rowe was educated at Queen Victoria School. Rowe started with Falkirk RFC before moving to Glasgow Hawks.

Rowe won the Premiership title and the Scottish Cup with Ayr in 2019; scoring three tries across both finals.

Professional career

He was named as part of the Scotland 7s that will be available to Glasgow Warriors for selection for the first part of the 2019-20 season to help the club deal with the loss of their international players for the 2019 Rugby World Cup. After a stint at Edinburgh he signed for London Irish ahead of the 2021–22 season.

International career

Rowe was capped at Scotland U19 grade.

Rowe was capped for Scotland U20. He played for the U20s from 2018 to 2019.

He was selected as part of the Scotland 7s squad for the London Sevens tournament. He was capped for Scotland 7s during that tournament.

In January 2022 Rowe was named in the Scotland squad for the 6 Nations Championship but did not get to play.

On 9 July 2022 he went on as a replacement for Rory Hutchinson late in the first half in the second test against Argentina in Salta to win his first full international cap. However, he played for just 12 minutes before going off injured.

References 

1998 births
Living people
People educated at Queen Victoria School, Dunblane
Scottish rugby union players
Glasgow Warriors players
Scotland international rugby sevens players
Male rugby sevens players
Scotland Club XV international rugby union players
Rugby union wings
Rugby union fullbacks
Edinburgh Rugby players
London Irish players
Scotland international rugby union players